Prosser Creek Dam (National ID # CA10179) is a dam in Nevada County, California.

It impounds Prosser Creek (a tributary of the Truckee River) for irrigation storage and winter and spring flood control, part of the Bureau's larger Washoe Project in the Tahoe region. The dam is owned and operated by the Bureau.

Recreation includes fishing (for rainbow and brown trout), boating, camping, hunting, and hiking.

See also 
List of dams and reservoirs in California
List of lakes in California

References 

Dams in California
United States Bureau of Reclamation dams
Buildings and structures in Nevada County, California
Reservoirs in Nevada County, California
Dams completed in 1962
Reservoirs in Northern California
1962 establishments in California